Rohitashva or Lohithashva is a mythological prince in Hinduism. His father was Harishchandra.

References
The Ananda-Vana of Indian mythology Art: Dr. Anand Krishna Felicitation Volume. Indica Books. 2004. Pages 345 and 346. Google Books

Characters in Hindu mythology